Jonaki (Moonlight) was an Assamese language magazine published from Calcutta in 1889. It was also the mouthpiece of the then Assamese literary society Oxomiya Bhaxa Unnati Xadhini Xobha in which the society’s aim and objectives were regularly expressed. The first editor of the magazine was Chandra Kumar Agarwala.

History
The Oxomiya Bhaxa Unnati Xadhini Xobha, after its formation in 1888, decided to publish a new monthly Assamese magazine. But the bigger problem was to finance it since all the associated members of the society were students. Chandra Kumar Agarwala, who belonged to a rich business family, came forward to finance the magazine and named it Jonaki ("Moonlight"). Agarwala was a FA student in Presidency College then and also a member of the society. He put forward two conditions to publish and edit the magazine:
Every member must take care of Jonaki;
Every member must write an article for Jonaki.
If those conditions were not met by anyone, a fine of Rs 15 would be imposed on him. The society accepted the conditions and the first issue was published. The exact publication date is not known, since only the Assamese month ‘Māgho’ and the year of publication 1889 were mentioned in the magazine, but the first edition is believed to have been put out on 9 February 1889. The printing of the magazine continued until 1898.  Publishing resumed in Guwahati in 1901 and continued until 1903. Satyanath Borah and Kanaklal Baruah were the editors of the Guwahati editions.

Aim and objectives
One unusual feature of the magazine was that it did not have an editorial. Rather, it contained a regular column called Atmokotha (Self-sketches) in which the ideology of the magazine as well as the society was expressed. The aim and objective of the magazine as expressed in this column in the first edition was (English translation: Uddipan Dutta):

The Jonaki Era
Jonaki marked the dawn of romanticism in Assamese literature. The first romantic poem, Bon Kunwori (The Wood Nymph), by Chandra Kumar Agarwala, and the first Assamese sonnet, Priyotomar Sithi (Letter from the beloved), by Hemchandra Goswami, were published in the magazine. Hemchandra Goswami’s Kaku Aru Hiya Nibilau (No More of my Heart to Anybody) was a unique poem of its kind. A regular humorous column titled Kripabor Boruar Kakotor Topola, by Lakshminath Bezbaroa, was also included. Kamalakanta Bhattacharjya’s Pahoroni (Oblivion) and Chandrakumar Agarwala’s Niyor (Dew-drops) were two e-making poems published in the first year of the magazine. The joint efforts of these pioneers established a new era in Assamese literature: The Jonaki Era, or the romantic age. The writers of Orunodoi chose the medium of prose, but the poetic grandeur in Assamese literature was achieved by the poets of the Jonaki group and their contemporaries.

People associated with the magazine
Notable members associated with the magazine include:
Lakshminath Bezbarua (1864–1938)
Chandra Kumar Agarwala (1867–1937)
Devakanta Baruah
Kamalakanta Bhattacharya
Hemchandra Goswami (1872–1928)
Padmanath Gohain Baruah (1871–1946)
Satyanath Bora (1860–1925)
Kanaklal Barua (1872–1940)
Ananda Chandra Agarwala(1874–1940)
Dharmeswari Debi Baruani (1892–1960)
Nalinibala Devi (1898–1977)
Raghunath Choudhary (1879–1968)
Ambikagiri Raichoudhury (1885–1967)
Jatindra Nath Duwara(1892–1964)

Issues
The total number of issues of Jonaki published during 1889–1898 is 69.
1st year: 11 issues
2nd year: 12 issues
3rd year: 10 issues
4th year: 11 issues
5th year: 7 issues
6th year: 11 issues
7th year: 6 issues
8th year: 1 issue

See also
 Assamese Language Movement
 Assamese Literature

References

External links
Theatrical movement in Assam by Babul Tamuly, Editorial, The Assam Tribune.

Assamese-language mass media
Assamese literature
Defunct magazines published in India
Defunct literary magazines
Literary magazines published in India
Monthly magazines published in India
Magazines established in 1889
Magazines disestablished in 1903
Mass media in Kolkata